Yossi Dora (Hebrew: יוסי דורה ;born August 25, 1981) is a retired Israeli footballer.

External links
Yossi Dora – reds

Living people
1982 births
Hapoel Haifa F.C. players
Hapoel Tzafririm Holon F.C. players
Bnei Sakhnin F.C. players
Bnei Yehuda Tel Aviv F.C. players
Hakoah Maccabi Amidar Ramat Gan F.C. players
Hapoel Petah Tikva F.C. players
Hapoel Ironi Kiryat Shmona F.C. players
Hapoel Acre F.C. players
Israeli Premier League players
Liga Leumit players
People from Zikhron Ya'akov
Israeli people of Egyptian-Jewish descent
Association football midfielders
Israeli footballers